Funing big cake is a type of cake found in Funing County in the Jiangsu province of China. It can be served as a tea cake or it can be fried.

History
Funing big cake can be dated to 2,000 years ago. It is also known as jade belt cake. Each name has its own myth. One version is that this name is given by the Qianlong Emperor. After eating one slice, the emperor spoke highly of it and gave it this name. However, another version also spread widely. Many years ago, local officials took it as a tribute delivering it to the palace. Someone was promoted due to this and got a jade belt as an award. As a result, its name of jade belt cake became widely used.

Ingredients
Its raw materials are traditionally sticky rice, white sugar and refined lard. Due to health concerns associated with lard consumption, sometimes vegetable oil is used instead of lard. Sometimes the cake also contains pine nuts, juglandis (walnuts), or other ingredients as garnishes.

See also

 List of cakes
 List of Chinese desserts
 List of desserts

References

Chinese desserts
Cakes
Chinese tea culture